Eugene Field Sr. (September 2, 1850 – November 4, 1895) was an American writer, best known for his children's poetry and humorous essays. He was known as the "poet of childhood".

Early life and education

Field was born in St. Louis, Missouri at 634 S. Broadway where today his boyhood home is open to the public as The Eugene Field House and St. Louis Toy Museum. After the death of his mother in 1856, he was raised by an aunt, Mary Field French, in Amherst, Massachusetts.

Field's father, attorney Roswell Martin Field, was famous for his representation of Dred Scott, the slave who sued for his freedom. Field filed the complaint in the Dred Scott v. Sandford case (sometimes referred to as "the lawsuit that started the Civil War") on behalf of Scott in the federal court in St. Louis, Missouri, whence it progressed to the U.S. Supreme Court.

Field attended Williams College in Williamstown, Massachusetts. His father died when Eugene turned 19, and he subsequently dropped out of Williams after eight months. He then went to Knox College in Galesburg, Illinois, but dropped out after a year, followed by the University of Missouri in Columbia, Missouri, where his brother Roswell was also attending. Field was not a serious student and spent much of his time at school playing practical jokes. He led raids on the president's wine cellar, painted the president's house school colors, and fired the school's landmark cannons at midnight. Field tried acting, studied law with little success, and also wrote for the student newspaper. He then set off for a trip through Europe but returned to the United States six months later, penniless.

Career

Field then set to work as a journalist for the St. Joseph Gazette in Saint Joseph, Missouri, in 1875.  That same year he married Julia Comstock, with whom he had eight children. For the rest of his life he arranged for all the money he earned to be sent to his wife, saying that he had no head for money himself.

Field soon rose to city editor of the Gazette.

He became known for his light, humorous articles written in a gossipy style, some of which were reprinted by other newspapers around the country. It was during this time that he wrote the famous poem "Lovers Lane" about a street in St. Joseph, Missouri.

From 1876 through 1880, Field lived in St. Louis, first as an editorial writer for the Morning Journal and subsequently for the Times-Journal. After a brief stint as managing editor of the Kansas City Times, he worked for two years as editor of the Denver Tribune.

In 1883, Field moved to Chicago where he wrote a humorous newspaper column called Sharps and Flats for the Chicago Daily News. His home in Chicago was near the intersection of N. Clarendon and W. Hutchinson in the neighborhood now known as Buena Park.

The Sharps and Flats column ran in the newspaper's morning edition.  In it, Field made quips about issues and personalities of the day, especially in the arts and literature. A pet subject was the intellectual greatness of Chicago, especially compared to Boston.  In April 1887, Field wrote, "While Chicago is humping herself in the interests of literature, art and the sciences, vain old Boston is frivoling away her precious time in an attempted renaissance of the cod fisheries."  Also that year, Chicago's National League baseball club sold future baseball Hall of Famer Mike "King" Kelly to Boston, and coincidentally soon after, famous Boston poet and diplomat James Russell Lowell made a speaking tour of Chicago.  "Chicago feels a special interest in Mr. Lowell at this particular time because he is perhaps the foremost representative of the enterprising and opulent community which within the last week has secured the services of one of Chicago's honored sons for the base-ball season of 1887," Field wrote.  "The fact that Boston has come to Chicago for the captain of her baseball nine has reinvigorated the bonds of affection between the metropolis of the Bay state [sic] and the metropolis of the mighty west; the truth of this will appear in the mighty welcome which our public will give Mr. Lowell next Tuesday."

Four months later, upon Kelly's first return to Chicago as a player for Boston, Field would speak to "Col. Samuel J. Bosbyshell, the Prairie avenue millionaire."  Bosbyshell said, "I like Mr. Kelly better than I do Lowell.  When Lowell was here I had him out to the house to a $3,500 dinner, and do what I could, I couldn't get him waked up.  He didn't seem to want to talk about anything but literature.  Now, when I'm out in society I make it a point never to talk shop, and Lowell's peculiarity mortified me.  If it hadn't been for [Chicago humorist] Frank Lincoln, with his imitations and funny stories, the dinner would have been a stupid affair.  But Kelly is another kind of man; he is more versatile than Lowell.  I don't believe he mentioned books once during the four hours we sat at dinner last Saturday evening.  Nor did he confine his conversation to base-ball topics; he is deeply versed in turf lore, and he talked most entertainingly of the prominent race horses he was acquainted with and of the leading jockeys he has met."

Field first started publishing poetry in 1879, when his poem "Christmas Treasures" appeared in A Little Book of Western Verse. Over a dozen volumes of poetry followed and he became well known for his light-hearted poems for children, among the most famous of which are "Wynken, Blynken, and Nod" and "The Duel" (which is perhaps better known as "The Gingham Dog and the Calico Cat"). Equally famous is his poem about the death of a child, "Little Boy Blue". Field also published a number of short stories, including "The Holy Cross" and "Daniel and the Devil."

The volume, The Love Affairs of a Bibliomaniac, was published posthumously with an introduction by Field's brother, Roswell Martin Field in 1896.

Field died in Chicago of a heart attack at the age of 45. He is buried at the Church of the Holy Comforter in Kenilworth, Illinois. Slason Thompson's 1901 biography of Field states that he was originally buried in Graceland Cemetery in Chicago, but his son-in-law, Senior Warden of the Church of the Holy Comforter, had him reinterred on March 7, 1926.

Legacy

Several of his poems were set to music with commercial success by composers such as Isabel Stewart North and Ella May Dunning Smith. Many of his works were accompanied by paintings from Maxfield Parrish. 

His childhood home in St. Louis is now a museum. The Eugene Field House contains many of Field's mementos, including original manuscripts, books, furniture, personal effects, and some of the toys that inspired his poems.

Field has his own star on the St. Louis Walk of Fame.

In 2016, Field was inducted into the Chicago Literary Hall of Fame.

As a memorial to Field, a statue of the Dream Lady from his poem "Rock-a-by-Lady" was erected in 1922 at the Lincoln Park Zoo in Chicago.  There is also a park and fieldhouse named in his honor in Chicago's Albany Park neighborhood. In nearby Oak Park, Illinois, another park is named in his honor.  A statue of Wynken, Blynken and Nod adorns Washington Park, near Field's Denver home.  Another statue of Wynken, Blynken and Nod sits in the center of the town square (called "the green" by locals) in Wellsboro, Pa.

Numerous elementary schools throughout the Midwest are named for him, e.g. Eugene Field Elementary School in Chicago, Illinois; Wheeling, Illinois; Rock Island, Illinois; Elmhurst, Illinois; Normal, Illinois;  Park Ridge, Illinois; Maryville, Missouri; St. Joseph, Missouri; Hannibal, Missouri; Columbia, Missouri; Mexico, Missouri; Neosho, Missouri; Poplar Bluff, Missouri; Springfield, Missouri; Webb City, Missouri; Manhattan, Kansas; Ottawa, Kansas; Minneapolis, Minnesota; and formerly in Muncie, Indiana (closed in 1973).

Other schools named after Field are located in Littleton, Colorado; Sioux Falls, South Dakota; Tulsa, Oklahoma; Altus, Oklahoma; Oklahoma City, Oklahoma; Hugo, Oklahoma; Beaumont, Texas; Houston, Texas; Albuquerque, New Mexico; Mesa, Arizona;  Pasadena, California; San Diego, California; and Silverton, Oregon. 

One of the branches of the Denver Public Library near Field's Denver home is named after him, as is an apartment building in Denver's Poet's Row. A dormitory in the Orchard Hill residential area at the University of Massachusetts Amherst also bears Field's name.

Before his death, Field wrote and published an anonymous work about a 12-year-old boy being seduced by a woman in her 30s. It was titled "Only a Boy". In the 1920s, American drama critic and magazine editor George Jean Nathan recalled it as a popular forbidden work among those coming of age at the turn of the century, along with Fanny Hill and "Green Girls of Paris". It was published by Grove Press in 1968 with the real author's name.

See also

Nick Kenny
O. O. McIntyre

References

External links

 
 
 
 
 
 Eugene Field: Profile and Poems at Poets.org
 Eugene Field Collection at the Harry Ransom Center at the University of Texas at Austin
 
 
Eugene Field Collection. Yale Collection of American Literature, Beinecke Rare Book and Manuscript Library.

1850 births
1895 deaths
American children's writers
American columnists
American humorists
American newspaper editors
Knox College (Illinois) alumni
Williams College alumni
Poets from Missouri
Poets from Massachusetts
People from Amherst, Massachusetts
Writers from St. Louis
University of Missouri alumni
News-Press & Gazette Company people
19th-century American poets
American male poets
19th-century American journalists
American male journalists
Children's poets
19th-century American male writers